The London Agreement on German External Debts, also known as the London Debt Agreement  (German: Londoner Schuldenabkommen), was a debt relief treaty between the Federal Republic of Germany and creditor nations. The Agreement was signed in London on February 27, 1953, and came into force on September 16, 1953.

Overview 
On May 24, 1951, the US and UK Departments of Foreign Affairs respectively, informed the Allied Countries involved in the settlement, about a new arrangement regarding Germany's External Debts. The content of the dispatch made the main points of discussion clear from the start. The dispatch contained the following texts.  

In response to the Allies, Adenauer informed them about Germany’s desire to repay its debts. The Conference on German External Debts (also known as the London Debt Conference) was held between February 28, 1952 and August 28, 1952. The Agreement reached at the Conference was signed in London on February 27, 1953. The Agreement was ratified by the United States, France and United Kingdom on September 16, 1953, at which point the agreement came into force. The Agreement was firstly turned down by the Bundestag and then approved on a following vote.

Debts covered by the Agreement 
The parties that were involved besides West Germany included Belgium, Canada, Ceylon, Denmark, France, Greece, Iran, the Republic of Ireland, Italy, Liechtenstein, Luxembourg, Norway, Pakistan, Spain, Sweden, Switzerland, the Union of South Africa, the United Kingdom of Great Britain and Northern Ireland, the United States of America, and Yugoslavia.  The states of the Eastern Bloc were not involved.

Some amounts owed by Germany arose from its efforts to pay war reparations, and others were associated with large scale loans by the United States. In total, 80 percent of Germany’s external obligations were owed to the United States, the Netherlands, the United Kingdom and Switzerland.

The Agreement covered loans arising from external investments due to the Dawes Plan, and loans from economic aid to Germany. The support was provided by two major programs, the GARIOA and the Marshall Plan.

Debts that would be settled by different arrangements were excluded from the London Agreement. Claims arising by countries damaged by Germany during World War II were not included. The debts to be settled by the London Agreement included; 

The Agreement was based on three important conditions. Firstly, the total amount that Germany was obligated to pay would be greatly reduced. The repayments’ timeframe should be stretched long enough in order to help Germany’s economy grow. Last but not least, the total that was supposed to be paid per year was associated with Germany’s “ability to make transfers”. It can be described as a broad based Agreement as it settled just about every kind of German debt arising from the period before and after the Second World War.

The total under negotiation was 16 billion marks of debt resulting from the Treaty of Versailles after World War I which had not been paid in the 1930s, but which Germany decided to repay to restore its reputation. This money was owed to government and private banks in the U.S., France and Britain. Another 16 billion marks represented postwar loans by the U.S. According to several commentators, the total of debts arising before World War II were 16.1 billion marks, while debts after the War were calculated to be 16.2 billion marks. Under the London Agreement, the repayable amount was reduced by 50% to about 15 billion marks and stretched out over 30 years, and compared to the fast-growing German economy were of minor impact. An important term of the agreement was that repayments were only due while West Germany ran a trade surplus, and that repayments were limited to 3% of export earnings. The amounts set by the Agreement were meant to be paid by the profit resulting from German exports, not from stockpile or new loaned amounts. This gave Germany's creditors a powerful incentive to import German goods, assisting reconstruction. After the settlement came into force, for the next five years, until 1958, Germany had to pay only debts arising from unpaid interest. This is another example of attempts made to help Germany’s economy grow before starting to pay the owed amounts. This way, the Allies also acknowledged the willingness of Germany to compensate Israel.

After the five-year mark, Germany was under obligation to pay a fixed amount of 765 million Marks per year. As time went by Germany’s exports increased significantly, making fulfilment of payments a lot easier and reducing their negative effects on the economy. Debts covered by the Agreement were almost paid off during the 1970s. Germany continued to pay the fixed amount until the last payment was settled in 1983.

Part of the agreement concerned debts to be paid after the reunification of Germany. For many decades this seemed unlikely to transpire, but in 1990 Deutsche Mark 239.4 million in deferred interest became due. These claims were repaid by means of "Fundierungsschuldverschreibungen" (Funding Debt Securities) with a maturity of 20 years. On 3 October 2010 the final payment of €69.9 million was made on these bonds, the last payment by Germany on known debts from both world wars.

Negotiations 

The negotiations started with the Allies creating a Commission. The Commission's key role was to determine the types of debts that would be addressed by the London Agreement. During the process, the two sides negotiated the terms of the Agreement “as equals”. The first conference was held in Bonn, in June 1951. The next conference was held in London in July 1951.

In February 1952 another conference occurred. This was the most essential moment of the entire negotiation process. The total amounts of debts and the compensations’ deadlines were the main topic of conversation. Germany’s negotiating skills played a huge role in the settlements’ outcome.

In the last parts of negotiations, some “intergovernmental debts” were settled and “detailed technical reports” were produced that were included in the London Agreement.

Impact 
The agreement significantly contributed to the growth of the post-war German economy and re-emergence of Germany as a world economic power. A 2018 study in the European Review of Economic History showed that the London Agreement "spurred economic growth in three main ways: creating fiscal space for public investment; lowering costs of borrowing; and stabilising inflation." It allowed Germany to enter international economic institutions such as the World Bank and the International Monetary Fund. Another study has shown that the London Agreement can be associated with a "rise in real per capita social expenditure in health, education, housing, and economic development". The stabilization of inflation was a major benefit for the German economy. West Germany's new currency, the Deutsche Mark was highly unstable until 1953. After the signing of the Agreement, it stabilized due to the German Debt relief. The transition of West Germany from a debtor to a creditor by the middle of the 1950s, had an impact on Germany's economic growth as well. The Agreement's outcome can be described as a German economic miracle. Germany achieved all of the above, despite being obligated to pay the total amount of war reparations (with interest) prior to the London Conference and despite the presence of an Arbitral tribunal.

See also
 German reparations for World War II
 Marshall Plan
 World War I reparations
 Dawes Plan, 1924–29
 Young Plan, 1930–32
 Hoover Moratorium stopped payments in 1931

References

Further reading

 Timothy W. Guinnane, "Financial Vergangenheitsbewältigung: The 1953 London Debt Agreement" (Economic Growth Center, Yale University, 2004) online

External links
Text of the treaty
 Éric Toussaint, The Marshall Plan and the Debt Agreement on German debt
 Timothy W. Guinnane, Financial Vergangenheitsbewältigung: The 1953 London Debt Agreement

1953 in Germany
Economy of West Germany
History of government debt
Reparations
Treaties concluded in 1953
Treaties of West Germany
Treaties of Australia
Treaties of Belgium
Treaties of Canada
Treaties of Sri Lanka
Treaties of Denmark
Treaties of France
Treaties of Greece
Treaties of Iran
Treaties of Ireland
Treaties of Italy
Treaties of Liechtenstein
Treaties of Luxembourg
Treaties of Norway
Treaties of Pakistan
Treaties of Spain
Treaties of Sweden
Treaties of Switzerland
Treaties of South Africa
Treaties of the United Kingdom
Treaties of the United States
Treaties of Yugoslavia
Debt